Bomelius may refer to:

Bomelius, the familiar of the sorcerer Feats
Bomelius, fictional character in The Maid of Pskov and The Tsar's Bride